Siegfried Buback (3 January 1920, Wilsdruff, Saxony – 7 April 1977, Karlsruhe) was the Attorney General of West Germany from 1974 until his murder in 1977.

Life and career 
Buback studied at the University of Leipzig. From 1940 to 1945, he was a member of the Nazi Party, while serving as a soldier in World War II. From 1945 to 1947, he was a prisoner of war in France. In 1953 he became an attorney, and continued his career until 1972 as general attorney. 

His name first appeared in public in 1962 when he accused the political magazine Der Spiegel of high treason in the Spiegel scandal. In 1966, the case lead to a groundbreaking ruling  of the Federal Constitutional Court of Germany about the freedom of the press.

In the 1970s he was decidedly opposed to the Red Army Faction (RAF) and became the first assassination victim, along with his driver Wolfgang Göbel and judicial officer Georg Wurster, in a series of events called the "German Autumn".

Assassination
On 7 April 1977, Buback was shot by members of the RAF while travelling from his home in Neureut to the Bundesgerichtshof in Karlsruhe. While Buback's Mercedes 230.6 was stopped at a traffic light, two unknown persons on a Suzuki GS 750 motorcycle pulled alongside him, both wearing olive green motorcycle helmets. The passenger on the rear of the motorcycle quickly fired fifteen shots with a semi-automatic HK43 rifle at the vehicle before fleeing. Buback and his driver, Göbel, died at the scene of the crime; Wurster died six days later from his injuries. Even though four RAF members (Christian Klar, Knut Folkerts, Günter Sonnenberg, and Brigitte Mohnhaupt) were formally charged and prosecuted in connection with the Buback murder, important details of their involvement have not been solved. German authorities have so far been unable to find out who was driving the motorcycle and who was firing the weapon at Buback.

In April 2007, 30 years after his assassination, Buback's violent death again became the subject of public discussion when his son, Michael Buback, was contacted by former RAF member Peter-Jürgen Boock. Boock shared details with Buback's son indicating that it was Stefan Wisniewski who had fired the gun at Siegfried Buback. Verena Becker, another former RAF member, has also claimed Wisniewski was the killer.

On 6 July 2012, Becker was convicted of assisting the (still unknown) murderers and sentenced to four years in prison.

See also
List of unsolved murders

References

1920 births
1977 deaths
Assassinated German people
Assassinated Nazis
Deaths by firearm in Germany
German murder victims
German prisoners of war in World War II
German prosecutors
Jurists from Saxony
Male murder victims
Nazi Party members
People from Sächsische Schweiz-Osterzgebirge
People murdered in Germany
Public Prosecutors General of Germany
Unsolved murders in Germany
Victims of the Red Army Faction
German prisoners of war in World War II held by France